The 2003 Bauchi State gubernatorial election occurred on April 19, 2003. Incumbent Governor, PDP's Adamu Mu'azu won election for a second term, defeating ANPP's Ibrahim Jarma Katagum and three other candidates.

Adamu Mu'azu emerged winner in the PDP gubernatorial primary election. He retained Abdulmalik Mohammed as his running mate.

Electoral system
The Governor of Bauchi State is elected using the plurality voting system.

Results
A total of five candidates registered with the Independent National Electoral Commission to contest in the election. Incumbent Governor, Adamu Mu'azu won election for a second term, defeating four other candidates.

The total number of registered voters in the state was 2,130,557.

References 

Bauchi State gubernatorial elections
Bauchi State gubernatorial election
Bauchi State gubernatorial election